Syntypistis viridipicta is a species of moth of the family Notodontidae first described by Wileman in 1910. It is found in northern India, Sundaland, China (Zheijiang, Fujian, Hubei, Hunan,  Guangdong, Guangxi, Guizhou, Hainan, Jiangxi), Taiwan, Myanmar, Thailand, Vietnam, Nepal, Laos and Cambodia.

References

Moths described in 1910
Notodontidae